is a Japanese actor, voice actor and playwright from Aichi Prefecture, Japan. He is probably most known for the roles as Kanji Sasahara (Genshiken) and Yasunobu Hattori (Suzuka).

Filmography

Stage
 Nodame Cantabile (live-action TV drama) (as Michael (Puri Gorota - ep 4))
 Reborn!(Rebocon 2010) (as Byakuran)

Anime
 Genshiken (Voice of  Kanji Sasahara)
 Genshiken 2 (Voice of  Kanji Sasahara)
 Nodame Cantabile (Voice of Michael (Puri Gorota - ep 7))
 Suzuka (Voice of Yasunobu Hattori)
 Yu-Gi-Oh! GX (Voice of Ikazuchimaru)
 Zegapain (Voice of  Kuroshio)
 Reborn! (Voice of Byakuran)

OVA
 Genshiken (Voice of  Kanji Sasahara)

Tokusatsu
 Uchu Sentai Kyuranger (Voice of Media Tsuyoindaver (ep 23))

External links
 Official agency profile 
 

1974 births
Living people
Japanese male video game actors
Japanese male voice actors
Male voice actors from Aichi Prefecture